The Southern Railway Depot is a historic building in Decatur, Alabama.  The depot was built in 1904–05 along the Southern Railway line.  Decatur had become a transportation hub of North Alabama by the 1870s, with its connections to the Tennessee River, the east–west Tuscumbia, Courtland and Decatur Railroad (later operated by the Memphis and Charleston Railroad and the Southern Railway), and the north–south Louisville and Nashville Railroad.

The Southern's last train through the city was the Tennessean (Memphis-Washington, D.C., discontinued, 1968). The last train by the L&N, and the train with the last route going south toward Alabama's largest cities, was the Pan-American, (Cincinnati-New Orleans) which ended in 1971. Other L&N trains passing through were the Azalean (Cincinnati-New Orleans) and the Humming Bird (Cincinnati-New Orleans). The depot last functioned as a passenger station in 1979, when Amtrak cancelled its (Chicago-St. Petersburg / Miami) Floridian service.

The station is built of brick painted white, with quoins on the corners.  The building has a rectangular central section with narrower wings stretching along the tracks.  The central section has a hipped roof, while the wings have gable roofs; both have deep eaves with decorative brackets.  The main entrance is covered by a porte-cochère with arched openings.  The depot was listed on the National Register of Historic Places in 1980.

References

National Register of Historic Places in Morgan County, Alabama
Railway stations on the National Register of Historic Places in Alabama
Railway stations in the United States opened in 1905
Buildings and structures in Decatur, Alabama
Transportation buildings and structures in Morgan County, Alabama
Decatur
Former Amtrak stations in Alabama